David Gilbert (born February 9, 1991) is a Canadian professional ice hockey player who is currently under contract to Belfast Giants of the Elite Ice Hockey League (EIHL). He previously played with the Dragons de Rouen of the French Ligue Magnus and the Rockford IceHogs of the American Hockey League (AHL). Gilbert was selected by the Chicago Blackhawks in the 7th round (209th overall) of the 2009 NHL Entry Draft.

Playing career
Gilbert played four seasons (2007-2011) of major junior hockey in the Quebec Major Junior Hockey League (QMJHL) where he scored 70 goals and 86 assists for 156 points in 209 games played. In 2009 Gilbert was selected to play in the CHL Top Prospects Game.

Gilbert made his professional debut in the American Hockey League with the Rockford IceHogs during the 2009–10 season. On May 31, 2011, the Chicago Blackhawks signed Gilbert to a three-year entry-level contract.

On August 19, 2014, the Orlando Solar Bears of the ECHL announced that they had signed Gilbert as an unrestricted free agent. After attending AHL affiliate, the Toronto Marlies training camp, Gilbert was traded prior to the 2014–15 season, by the Solar Bears to the Wheeling Nailers on October 16, 2014.

A free agent following the 2015–16 season with the Kalamazoo Wings, Gilbert signed abroad in France, agreeing to a one-year deal with Boxers de Bordeaux of the Magnus on July 18, 2016.

From the 2022 season, Gilbert signed with the Belfast Giants in the EIHL while he studies for a Master of Business Administration from the Ulster University Business School.

Career statistics

References

External links

1991 births
Living people
Acadie–Bathurst Titan players
Bloomington Blaze (CHL) players
Boxers de Bordeaux players
Canadian ice hockey centres
Chicago Blackhawks draft picks
Dragons de Rouen players
Fehérvár AV19 players
Ice hockey people from Quebec
Kalamazoo Wings (ECHL) players
Motor České Budějovice players
People from Châteauguay
Quebec Remparts players
Rockford IceHogs (AHL) players
Toledo Walleye players
Wheeling Nailers players
Belfast Giants players
Canadian expatriate ice hockey players in the United States
Canadian expatriate ice hockey players in the Czech Republic
Canadian expatriate ice hockey players in Hungary
Canadian expatriate ice hockey players in Northern Ireland
Canadian expatriate ice hockey players in France